Nature Physics is a monthly  peer-reviewed scientific journal published by Nature Portfolio. It was first published in October 2005 (volume 1, issue 1). The chief editor is Andrea Taroni, who is a full-time professional editor employed by this journal.

Scope
Nature Physics publishes both pure and applied research from all areas of physics. Subject areas covered by the journal include quantum mechanics, condensed-matter physics, optics, thermodynamics, particle physics, and biophysics.

Abstracting and indexing
The journal is indexed in the following databases:  
Chemical Abstracts Service – CASSI
Science Citation Index
Science Citation Index Expanded
Current Contents – Physical, Chemical & Earth Sciences

According to the Journal Citation Reports, the journal has a 2021 impact factor of 19.684, ranking it 4th out of 86 journals in the category "Physics, Multidisciplinary".

References

External links
 Official website

Physics journals
Nature Research academic journals
Publications established in 2005
Monthly journals
English-language journals